Ryan Murphy is Councillor for Chandler Ward, in Brisbane City Council. Chandler Ward covers Chandler, Burbank, Carindale, Gumdale, Mackenzie, Mansfield, Ransome, Rochedale, and parts of Belmont and Wakerley.

Early life
Growing up, Murphy attended Carina State School and Iona College at Lindum. After school he joined the Australian Army Reserves as a Signaller, and gained a Bachelor of Arts from the University of Queensland. He then worked as a public relations consultant in the mining and construction sector.

Political career

Queensland Parliament
Murphy first ran for office at the 2009 Queensland Election against the deputy premier, Paul Lucas, in the seat of Lytton. He was ultimately unsuccessful, though he managed to achieve a swing of 4%.

Brisbane City Council
He stood for council in 2012, defeating former Deputy Mayor John Campbell who was the longest serving councillor in Brisbane, having represented Doboy for 30 years prior.

At the 2012 Brisbane City Council election the Liberal National Party gained a 5.4% swing in the ward, giving Murphy a 1,993 vote lead over Campbell. Elected at age 23, Murphy is the youngest councillor on Council.

On 5 March 2013, an arson attack on Murphy's ward office was foiled by a Queensland Police Service patrol, who spotted a man attempting to set the building alight with a "burning truck tyre". The 41-year-old male was arrested but no motive was identified for the attack.

In November 2015, the Electoral Commission of Queensland redistributed the boundaries of Doboy Ward, transferring the predominantly conservative areas of Gumdale, Ransome and part of Wakerley to Chandler Ward, cutting Murphy's margin from 4.6% to 1.8%.

Murphy was re-elected at the 2016 Council election, increasing his majority to 4.3% despite a 9.2% swing against the LNP. Following the election, Murphy was re-appointed Deputy Chairman of the Finance Committee.

Following the resignation of Lord Mayor Graham Quirk on 28 March 2019, incoming Lord Mayor Adrian Schrinner promoted Murphy to Civic Cabinet giving him responsibility for the Public and Active Transport Committee. Murphy was also given special responsibility for the delivery of the Brisbane Metro, as well as the five new green bridges which Lord Mayor Adrian Schrinner announced as his first major investment for the city.

References

Living people
People from Brisbane
Liberal National Party of Queensland politicians
Queensland local councillors
Year of birth missing (living people)